Stockholm Internet eXchange (STHIX) manages multiple carrier- and data center-neutral internet exchange point (IXP) situated in Copenhagen / Malmö, Gothenburg, Stockholm, Sundsvall, and Umeå. The Stockholm IXP is the second largest IXP in the region in terms of both bandwidth (average/peak) and number of members. Peak bandwidth is above 230 gigabits per second.

History 
STHIX was founded in 2005 and had its first members connected in late 2006. Since then the members count has grown to more than 120. It was initially located at two data centers in the Stockholm area (Telecity Bromma and Stokab KN1) with a 100 megabit interconnect and has since expanded to a total of 6 data centers in Stockholm, 1 in Gothenburg, 1 in Sundsvall, 1 in Umeå and 5 in Copenhagen/Malmö.

Today 
STHIX offers free 100M ports at all of the data centers, and 1G / 10G / 100G ports at a cost-effective price, compared to the competition in the region, while still delivering a highly reliable service. STHIX is based mainly on Arista Networks hardware.

See also
Netnod Internet Exchange i Sverige
List of Internet exchange points
List of Internet exchange points by size

References

External links
 
Traffic statistics
Member list

Internet exchange points in Europe